SPHR may refer to:

 Solidarity for Palestinian Human Rights
 Senior Professional in Human Resources, a certificate rating by the Human Resource Certification Institute